Louis Vatrican (7 May 1904, Monaco – 7 June 2007, Monaco) was a Monegasque agronomist.

Career
Vatrican served as the director of the Jardin Exotique de Monaco from 1933 to 1969. Vatrican added succulents from Africa to the existing South American succulents, some of which died in 1985-86. After he retired in 1969, Vatrican was succeeded by Marcel Kroenlein.

The Vatricania guentherii, a cactus endemic to South America, was named in his honor in 1950 by Curt Backeberg.

Death
Vatrican died on 7 June 2007 in Monaco, aged 103.

References

1904 births
2007 deaths
Monegasque agronomists
Monegasque centenarians
Men centenarians
20th-century agronomists